Tillandsia pedicellata is a plant species in the genus Tillandsia. This species is native to Bolivia.

References

pedicellata
Flora of Bolivia